The Men's C-2 1000 metres event was an open-style, pairs canoeing event conducted as part of the Canoeing at the 2000 Summer Olympics program.

Medalists

Results

Heats
14 teams entered in two heats. The top three finishers from each heat advanced directly to the finals while the remaining teams were relegated to the semifinal.

Overall Results Heats

Semifinal
The top three finishers from the semifinal advanced to the final.

Final

References
2000 Summer Olympics Canoe sprint results. 
Sports-reference.com 2000 C-2 1000 m results.
Wallechinsky, David and Jaime Loucky (2008). "Canoeing: Men's Canadian Doubles 1000 Meters". In The Complete Book of the Olympics: 2008 Edition. London: Aurum Press Limited. p. 484.

Men's C-2 1000
Men's events at the 2000 Summer Olympics